Cantemir is a district of the Romanian city of Oradea.

Districts of Oradea